Azania Stewart (born 13 March 1989 in Camden, England) is a basketball player for Great Britain women's national basketball team. She was part of the squad for the 2012 Summer Olympics.

On 16 July 2013, the 6'4" (194 cm) tall centre signed to play with the Adelaide Lightning who play in the Australian Women's National Basketball League (WNBL).

On 27 August 2017, her boyfriend, American football player Menelik Watson, proposed to her during a pre-season game, which she accepted.

References

External links
 
 
 
 
 
 

1989 births
Living people
British women's basketball players
Basketball players at the 2012 Summer Olympics
Olympic basketball players of Great Britain
Centers (basketball)
Commonwealth Games medallists in basketball
Commonwealth Games silver medallists for England
Basketball players at the 2018 Commonwealth Games
Medallists at the 2018 Commonwealth Games